
Avellana may refer to:

People
 Andy Avellana, Filipino paratriathlete
 Daisy Avellana (1917–2013), Filipino stage actress and theater director
 Lamberto V. Avellana (1915–1991), Filipino film and stage director

Species
 Corylus avellana, common hazelnut
 Cronia avellana, species of sea snail
 Gevuina avellana, Chilean hazelnut
 Lempkeella avellana, species of moth
 Odostomia avellana, species of sea snail
 Saurauia avellana, species of plant

Other
 Collectio Avellana, collection of documents
 Fonte Avellana, Roman Catholic hermitage in Italy
 San Pietro Avellana, municipality in Italy

See also
 Avellanar, in Spain